The Alabama Wildlife Center is a wildlife rehabilitation and education center located in Oak Mountain State Park in Pelham, Alabama, United States.  It is the largest such center in the state.

The center treats injured or orphaned native birds from across the state of Alabama from over 100 different species.  Every year, AWC receives almost 2,000 avian patients.

The Alabama Wildlife Center's education program focuses on conservation education and the preservation of Alabama's biodiversity and avian resources.  AWC's programming reaches over 30,000 people annually from Alabama and beyond.

History

The center was founded in Birmingham in 1977 by Anne Miller as an all-volunteer organization to meet the need for the rescue and rehabilitation of native Alabama wildlife. By 1981, Miller left her job as a zookeeper with the Birmingham Zoo to run the center full-time. In 1987, the state of Alabama, in recognition of the center's service, donated the use of a closed restaurant inside Oak Mountain State Park. Currently the state covers the cost of the building maintenance and most utilities, while the center is responsible for capital improvements and operating expenses.

The center was recognized as a "Best of the Road" destination in the 2006 edition of the Rand McNally road atlas.

Exhibits

While not all of the animals being treated at the center will be on display at once, visitors have the opportunity to observe many of the patients through one-way windows. The nursery, solarium and Backyard Wildlife Demonstration Garden are located inside the building. Adjacent to the main building are the Raptor Wing and Freedom Flight, where large birds on the cusp of release are housed. Nearby is the Treetop Nature Trail, where otherwise-healthy birds unable to be released into the wild may be observed in a natural setting along an elevated boardwalk.

External links
 Official website
 Slideshow from the Shelby County Reporter

Landmarks in Alabama
1977 establishments in Alabama
Wildlife rehabilitation and conservation centers
Animal welfare organizations based in the United States
Buildings and structures in Shelby County, Alabama
Tourist attractions in Shelby County, Alabama